União Desportiva Vilafranquense is a Portuguese football club from Vila Franca de Xira, Lisbon District. It currently plays in the Liga Portugal 2, the second tier of the Portuguese football league system, following its promotion in 2019.

History
The club was created in April 12, 1957 with the merger between four local sports clubs: Grupo de Foot-Ball Operário Vilafranquense, Águia Sport Club Vilafranquense, Hóquei Clube Vilafranquense and Ginásio Vilafranquense.

In the 2016–17 Taça de Portugal, Vilafranquense defeated G.S. Loures, Vilaverdense F.C. and G.D. Vitória de Sernache to reach a fourth-round tie at home to F.C. Paços de Ferreira of the Primeira Liga. They beat the top-flight team 1–0 on 20 November, with a goal by Marocas. In the next round (last 16), they lost by the same score at Vitória S.C., also of the Primeira.

In the 2018–19 Campeonato de Portugal, Vilafranquense came second in Serie C behind U.D. Leiria. In the play-offs, they dispatched Lusitânia F.C. and then Leiria on penalties to win promotion. This was the club's first time in a national second division. On 23 June in the final at the Estádio Nacional against Casa Pia A.C., the club drew 2–2 then lost 4–2 on penalties.

Due to the inadequate facilities of their Campo do Cevadeiro, Vilafranquense had to play their LigaPro home games 50 kilometres away at the Estádio Municipal in Rio Maior.

Current squad

Out on loan

References

External links
Official website

Football clubs in Portugal
1957 establishments in Portugal
Association football clubs established in 1957
Sport in Vila Franca de Xira
Liga Portugal 2 clubs